Telesys was an Atari 2600 game developer and publisher that released six games, all in 1982, before going out of business. Their slogan was "Fun in games." Fast Food was one of their more well-known titles.

The only catalog from Telesys (1983) indicated that the company planned to become a "full-line software company," releasing games, educational, and productivity software for home computers. The company folded before this happened.

Games
Telesys released the following games:
 Coconuts
 Cosmic Creeps
 Demolition Herby, a line-coloring game similar to Amidar
 Fast Food
 Ram It
 Stargunner

Unreleased prototypes
 Bouncin' Baby Bunnies (1983)
 The Impossible Game

References

Atari 2600
Defunct video game companies of the United States
Video game development companies
Video game companies established in 1982